This is a timeline of the history of horse racing on television in the UK.

1950s 

 1951
 The BBC broadcasts horse racing for the first time when it televises races from Ascot.
 1952
 No events.
 1953
 No events.
 1954
 No events.
 1955
 ITV launches and shows horse racing from its earliest days on air.
 1956
 The BBC shows Glorious Goodwood for the first time.
 1957
 No events.
 1958
 10 October – The first edition of multi-sport Saturday afternoon television show Grandstand is broadcast and horse racing is a regular feature of the programme and will feature in almost every edition of the Saturday programme.
 1959
March 1959 The Lincolnshire Handicap is first televised by the BBC. The BBC would continue to cover the race until the closure of Lincoln.

1960s 
 1960
26 March – The Grand National is televised for the first time, by the BBC Television Service.
 1 June – ITV and the BBC both show the Epsom Derby because it was a protected event which could not be exclusive to either channel. However, the rest of the Epsom events, including The Oaks, are broadcast exclusively on ITV.
 1961 to 1968
 No events.
 1969
 14 October – The first ITV Seven takes place, under the title of They’re Off!. The required number of races was obtained by televising races at two courses each week.

1970s 
 1970
 No events.
 1971
 No events.
 1972
 No events.
 1973
 No events.
 1974
 No events.
 1975
 4 June – ITV becomes the only channel to show the Epsom Derby - the race had previously been shown by both ITV and the BBC.
 1976
 No events.
 1977
 1 June – The BBC shows the Epsom Derby for the first time in three years. The race, and the rest of the Epsom meeting, is shown on ITV.
 1978
 No events.
 1979
 6 June – The BBC shows the Epsom Derby for the final time in the 20th century.

1980s 
 1980
 January – Meetings from Kempton Park switch from the BBC to ITV.
 4 June – ITV once again becomes the exclusive broadcast of the Epsom Derby.
 1981
 No events.
 1982
 No events.
 1983
 Racing coverage is cut back on ITV with the ITV Seven no longer being a guaranteed slot on World of Sport, indeed the ITV3 or ITV4 becomes part of the coverage. Several regional ITV stations stop showing midweek racing altogether.
 1984
 22 March – Horse racing coverage is broadcast on Channel 4 for the first time, resulting in the launch Channel 4 Racing.
 1985
 5 October – The first weekend horse racing is shown on Channel 4 when ITV transfers coverage of horse racing to Channel 4 after the end of World of Sport.
 1986
 Channel 4, who until now had shown meetings that ITV would have been contracted to show, announces their own new contract with Ayr, Doncaster, Epsom, Kempton Park, Newcastle, Newmarket, Sandown and York. This means that they will not have weekly Saturday coverage and in winter, their only midweek coverage will be the King George VI Chase fixture at Kempton. Between 1986 and 1992 some fixtures are added, Chester's May meeting for example, however it will be 1992 before the weekly Saturday coverage is established.
 1987
 No events.
 1988
 1 June – ITV ends its association with horse racing for the next three decades when it simulcasts Channel 4's coverage of the Epsom Derby for the final time.
 1989
 No events.

1990s 
 1990
 No events.
 1991
 No events.
 1992
 No events.
 1993
 No events.
 1994
 15–17 March – The BBC shows The Cheltenham Festival for the final time.
 1995
 March – Channel 4 takes over as broadcaster of the Cheltenham Festival as well as other meetings held at Cheltenham.
 The Racing Channel launches and becomes the UK's first television channel devoted to a single sport.
 1996
 No events.
 1997
 No events.
 1998
 No events.
 1999
 No events.

2000s 
 2000
 10 June – Channel 4 shows the Epsom Derby for the final time for more than the next decade as the contract for Epsom transfers to the BBC. Channel 4 had shown the event since 1984, and exclusively since 1989. It will return to the channel in 2013 for four more years.
 2001
 9 June – For the first time since 1979, the BBC shows the Epsom Derby.
 2002
 Coverage of meetings at Newbury switches from the BBC to Channel 4.
 1 May – At The Races launches. Channel Four Television Corporation is one of the partners involved in the venture.
 2003
 January – The Racing Channel closes. It had been on air since 1995.
 2004
 29 March – At the Races closes down due to financial problems.
 29 May – Racing UK launches.
 11 June – At the Races relaunches as a stand-alone venture. without Channel Four.
2005
 No events.
 2006
 8 March – Racing TV launches an international racing channel Racing World with its output focussed on coverage from the United States. Consequently, Racing TV now concentrates on UK horse racing.
 2007
 28 January – The final edition of Grandstand is broadcast. Racing had been a regular feature of the programme, and alternated with other sports during the first half of the show. However, recent years had seen less racing on the programme as the BBC had started to reduce its coverage of the sport in the 2000s.
 Glorious Goodwood, alongside all other meetings held at Goodwood, transfer to Channel 4 from the BBC.
 2008
 No events.
 2009
 24 August – Racing World closes after just over three years on air.

2010s
2010
 As a result of reductions in the amount of horse racing shown on the BBC, the Corporation shows just 13 days of racing in 2010.
2011
 No events.
2012
 7 October – For the first time for many years, the Prix de l'Arc de Triomphe is not shown on terrestrial television - coverage is broadcast exclusively by At the Races and Racing UK. The BBC had shown the event for many years and Channel 4 had also shown the race between 1986 and 1994 and in 2001. The event returns to Channel 4 the following year.
 27 December – BBC Sport shows horse racing for the final time ahead of Channel 4 taking over as broadcaster of all terrestrial horse racing from the start of 2013. The BBC had scaled back its horse racing in recent years, gradually losing more and more events to Channel 4.
2013
 1 January – Channel 4 takes over as the exclusive terrestrial TV home of all horse racing in the UK. The BBC had scaled back its horse racing in recent years, gradually losing more and more events to Channel 4. Consequently, races such as The Grand National are shown on Channel 4 for the first time.
2014
 No events.
2015
 No events.
2016
 14 March – Racing UK begins broadcasting in high-definition.
 27 December – Channel 4 Racing comes to an end after more than 32 years ahead of the transfer of all terrestrial television coverage of the sport to ITV.
2017
 1 January – ITV takes over from Channel 4 as the exclusive terrestrial broadcaster of horse racing. The deal will see ITV broadcast nearly 100 days of racing each year - 60 on ITV4 and minimum of 34 fixtures on the main ITV channel. This is the first time since 1988 that the sport had been shown on ITV.
2018
 17 December – Racing UK rebrands itself as Racing TV, doing so in anticipation of the first live broadcast of racing on the channel from the Republic of Ireland on 1 January 2019.
2019
 1 January – Sky Sports Racing launches, replacing At the Races.

2020s
 2020
 No events.
 2021
 No events.

References

horse racing on UK television
horse racing on UK television
horse racing on UK television
Sports television in the United Kingdom
horse racing on UK television
Horse racing in Great Britain